Neocyclotidae is a family of tropical land snails with gills and an operculum, terrestrial gastropod mollusks in the informal group Architaenioglossa belonging to the clade Caenogastropoda (according to the taxonomy of the Gastropoda by Bouchet & Rocroi, 2005).

Subfamilies
Subfamilies within the family Neocyclotidae include:
 subfamily Neocyclotinae Kobelt & Möllendorff, 1897 - synonym:  Poteriinae Thiele, 1929; Crocidopomatinae F. G. Thompson, 1967; Dicristidae Golikov & Starobogatov, 1975
 subfamily Amphicyclotinae Kobelt & Möllendorff, 1897 - synonym: Aperostomatinae H. B. Baker, 1922

Genera 
Genera in the family Neocyclotidae include:

subfamily Neocyclotinae
 Crocidopoma Shuttleworth, 1856
 Dicrista F. G. Thompson, 1969
 Neocyclotus Fischer & Crosse, 1886 - type genus of the subfamily Neocyclotidae
 Poteria Gray, 1850

subfamily Amphicyclotinae
 Amphicyclotus Crosse & P. Fischer, 1879 - type genus of the family Amphicyclotinae
 Aperostoma Troschel, 1847

subfamily ?
 Amphicyclotulus Kobelt, 1912
 Austrocyclotus
 Barbacyclus
 Calaperostoma
 Cycladamsia
 Cycloadamsia
 Cyclobakeria
 Cyclochittya
 Cyclojamaicia
 Cyclopilsbrya
 Cyclovendreysia
 Daronia H. Adams, 1861 
 Farcimoides
 Gassiesia
 Gonatoraphe
 Incerticyclus
 Incidostoma
 Kondoraphe
 Lagocyclus
 Lithacaspis
 Mexcyclotus
 Ostodes
 Paramiella
 Ptychocochlis
 Rugicyclotus
 Tomocyclus
 Xenocyclus

References

External links